Macquarie Hills is a residential suburb of the City of Lake Macquarie, New South Wales, Australia, located  west of Newcastle's central business district near the northern end of Lake Macquarie between the town centres of Cardiff and Warners Bay. It is part of the City of Lake Macquarie north ward.

Originally part of the suburb of Cardiff, the boundaries of the new suburb were defined in 1991, and the status of suburb was given in 2001.

The Aboriginal people the Awabakal were the first people in this area.

References

External links
 History of Macquarie Hills (Lake Macquarie City Library)

Suburbs of Lake Macquarie